Visitation is an album by multi-instrumentalist and composer Joe McPhee, recorded in 1983 and first released on the Canadian Sackville label, it was rereleased on CD in 2003.

Reception

Allmusic reviewer Scott Yanow states "The interplay between these masterful improvisers on group originals and Albert Ayler's classic "Ghosts" is consistently impressive and worthy of a close investigation by the more open-eared segment of the jazz audience".

Track listing 
All compositions by Joe McPhee except as indicated
 "Exuma" - 4:23
 "Eleuthera" - 10:21
 "Home at Last" (Bill Smith) -  7:14
 "Ghosts" (Albert Ayler) - 7:22
 "If I Don't Fall" (David Prentice) - 5:47
 "A-Configuration" (Smith) - 8:24

Personnel 
Joe McPhee - tenor saxophone, soprano saxophone, pocket trumpet, flugelhorn
Bill Smith - soprano saxophone, sopranino saxophone, alto saxophone
 David Prentice - violin
David Lee - bass
Richard Barnard - drums

References 

Joe McPhee albums
1985 albums
Sackville Records albums